The Crosstown Line, designated Route H2, H3, and H4, is a daily bus route operated by the Washington Metropolitan Area Transit Authority between Brookland–CUA station and Tenleytown–AU station of the Red Line of the Washington Metro. The line operates every 24 minutes between 7AM and 9PM, and 30-40 minutes after 9PM at a combined frequency of 12 minutes during the day and, 30-40 minutes during the late nights. Trips roughly take 48 minutes to complete.

Background
Routes H2, H3, and H4 operate as part of the Crosstown Line between Brookland–CUA station and Tenleytown–AU station. Routes H2 and H4 operate daily while route H3 operates during the weekday peak-hours. Routes H2 and H4 serve the hospital complex along 1st Street, while route H3 skips the complex following a similar pathway to the H4. The line splits after serving Columbia Heights station. Route H2 mainly operates along Adams Mill Road, Connecticut Avenue, Van Ness Street, and Veazey Street while routes H3 and H4 mainly operate along Mount Pleasant Street, Park Road, Porter Street, and Wisconsin Avenue. Both routes connect Brookland and Tenleytown stations by bus without having to take the Red Line.

Routes H2, H3, and H4 currently operate out of Bladensburg division with some select weekday trips operating out of Western division.

H2 stops

H3 stops

H4 stops

History

Routes H2 and H4 originally operated under streetcars by the Capital Traction Company. The line was then made into buses in the 1920s. Routes H2 and H4 operated between Fort Lincoln and Westmoreland Circle connecting Tenleytown, Forest Hills, Cleveland Park, Mount Pleasant, Columbia Heights, Rock Creek Park, Brookland along Yuma Street, Massachusetts Avenue, Wisconsin Avenue, Porter Street NW (H4), Van Ness/Veazey Street NW (H2), Connecticut Avenue (H2), Columbia Road NW, Irving Street NW, Michigan Avenue NW/NE, Franklin Street NE, and 14th Street NE. It mostly provides service in outer DC without having to enter Downtown.

The line was later acquired by DC Transit in 1956 and later diverted to serve the Washington Hospital Complexes along 1st Street. It later became a Metrobus route in 1973.

On February 19, 1978 after Brookland–CUA station opened, routes H2 and H4 were diverted off Monroe Street to serve the new station. This gives residents access to the Red Line on its route. No route changes were made during its route.

On August 25, 1984, routes H2 and H4 were rerouted off Tenley Circle to serve Tenleytown–AU station in the middle of its route when it opened. No route changes were made on the route.

On September 18, 1999 after Columbia Heights station opened a series of changes were made to the H2 and H4.

Routes H2 was shorten to terminate at Van Ness–UDC station and route H4 was shorten to terminate at Tenleytown–AU station. Service to Westmoreland Circle and along Yuma Street was replaced by a new route N8 which will operate between Van Ness and Wesley Heights. This was due to resident complaint along Yuma Street and Tenleytown over H2 and H4 buses making loud noises along Yuma street causing noise pollution and damage to homes. The new N8 solves the noise complaint problem by using smaller and quieter 30 ft buses.

Routes H2 and H4 were also shorten from Fort Lincoln to Brookland–CUA station with the portion between the two points was replaced by a new route H6 which operates on the former route H2 and H4 routing.

A new route H3 was introduced to operate alongside route H4 during the weekday peak-hours between Brookland and Tenleytown stations following route H2's routing in Mount Pleasant and route H4 routing along Porter Street and Wisconsin Avenue plus operating along Reno Road. The main difference is route H3 would not serve the Hospital Complexes along 1st street and instead remain along Michigan Avenue.

On June 25, 2000, route H3 was rerouted along the H4 routing on Mount Pleasant Street, Park and Klingle roads instead of operating along Adams Mill Road, Irving Street, and Harvard Street where the H2 operates.

In 2010 during WMATA's FY2011 budget year, WMATA proposed to reroute route H2 back to Tenleytown–AU station discontinuing service to Van Ness–UDC station in order to replace route N8 which is proposed to be eliminated due to declining ridership. Route H2 would operate along Van Ness Street, Reno Road, Veazey Street, and Wisconsin Avenue. Route H3 would also be rerouted between the intersections of Porter Street & Reno Road NW and Wisconsin Avenue & Veazey Street NW via Porter Street and Wisconsin Avenue which follows the current H4 route. Alternative service along Connecticut Avenue to Van Ness will be available on routes L1, L2, and L4.

On December 19, 2010, route H2 was rerouted to turn on Van Ness Street, Reno Road, Veazey Street, and Wisconsin Avenue to serve Tenleytown–AU station in order to replace the N8 routing along those streets which was shortened to Tenleytown station. Route H3 service was also rerouted to remain on Porter Street and turn onto Wisconsin Avenue and follow the H4 routing to Tenleytown station. Service along Reno Street where the H3 operated plus H2 service to Van Ness–UDC station, and H3 service inside the Hospital Complex was discontinued. Routes L1, L2, and L4 took over the discontinued portion of the H2 along Connecticut Avenue but there was no alternative service is provided on Reno Road. As of 2020, there has been no major changes to routes H2, H3, or H4.

In September 2013, during WMATA's FY2014 budget year, WMATA proposed to convert route H3 into a MetroExtra limited-stop route and extend the route to Rhode Island Avenue–Brentwood station via 12th street and Rhode Island Avenue. This was to provide a more direct connection between Rhode Island Ave station, the hospital center complex, and Columbia Heights and provide a faster ride across town by limiting the number of stops. The current H3 routing between Brookland and Tenleytown, weekday service frequency and span of service will remain unaffected. Route H3 will serve the following stops:
 Rhode Island Avenue–Brentwood station
 Brookland–CUA station
 Michigan Avenue & 1st Street NW
 Georgia Avenue
 11th Street
 14th Street
 16th Street
 Park Road & Mount Pleasant Street
 Porter Street & Connecticut Avenue
 Porter Street & Wisconsin Avenue
 Tenleytown–AU station
Existing local stops will still be provided by routes H2 and H4.

During the COVID-19 pandemic, all route H3 was suspended and route H2 and H4 was reduced to operate on its Saturday supplemental schedule beginning on March 16, 2020. However on March 18, 2020, the line was further reduced to operate on its Sunday schedule. On March 21, 2020, route H2 weekend service was suspended and route H4 service was reduced to operate every 30 minutes. Additional service was added and Route H2 weekend service was restored on August 23, 2020 however route H3 remained suspended.

In September 2020, WMATA proposed to eliminate all route H3 service due to low federal funds. Later in February 2021, due to low federal funds, WMATA proposed to reroute the H2 and H4 to Friendship Heights station via Connecticut Avenue NW north of Calvert Street NW to replace the L1 and L2 beginning in January 2022. Service to Tenleytown–AU station, on Porter Street between Connecticut and Wisconsin Avenues, Wisconsin Avenue, and on Van Ness Street between Connecticut and Wisconsin Avenues and on Veazey Street will be eliminated.

On September 5, 2021, service was increased to operate every 12 minutes between both routes between 7:00 AM to 9:00 PM.

Incidents
 On July 21, 2014, an H4 driver and a 65-year-old male passenger got into an altercation near Tenleytown station after the passenger refused to pay the fare. The man punched the driver in the face while holding a blade in his fist. The driver was sent to the hospital after sustained a laceration to his face. The man was detained by the Metropolitan Police Department and later arrested by Metro Transit Police. The man was charged with assault with a deadly weapon.
 On January 22, 2020, an XN40 on the H4 slammed into half a dozen vehicles along Porter Street & Connecticut Avenue in Cleveland Park.

References

H2